Aino-Kaisa Ilona Pekonen (born 24 January 1979 in Riihimäki) is a Finnish politician of the Left Alliance. Pekonen is Finland's incumbent Minister of Social Affairs and Health. She has been a member of the Parliament of Finland since the 2011 election, and represents the Left Alliance in the municipal council of Riihimäki.

Pekonen originally served as a practical nurse. She has represented the constituency of Tavastia in the parliament since April 2011. She has previously served both as the chair of the Left Alliance Parliament Group and as a member of the Parliament's Social Affairs and Health Committee. She has also previously been the first deputy chair of the Left Alliance.

In January 2016, Pekonen announced her candidacy for the leadership of the Left Alliance. She withdrew from the race on 6 June 2016, after losing the advisory membership vote of the party to Li Andersson.

Pekonen's brother is the actor Aku Hirviniemi. Both of the siblings' parents are politicians of the Left Alliance.

References

External links 
Information on Aino-Kaisa Pekonen on the website of the Finnish Parliament

1979 births
Living people
People from Riihimäki
Left Alliance (Finland) politicians
Ministers of Social Affairs of Finland
Members of the Parliament of Finland (2011–15)
Members of the Parliament of Finland (2015–19)
Members of the Parliament of Finland (2019–23)
21st-century Finnish women politicians
Women government ministers of Finland